Chaetoprocta odata, the walnut blue, is a small butterfly found in India (Northwest India to Sikkim) and  Afghanistan that belongs to the lycaenids or blues family.

See also
List of butterflies of India
List of butterflies of India (Lycaenidae)

References
 
 

Butterflies of Asia